Enevoldsen is a surname. Notable people with the surname include: 

Bob Enevoldsen (1920–2005), American jazz saxophonist
Harald Enevoldsen (1911–2005), Danish chess master
Fernando Enevoldsen (born 1965), Argentine skier
Jens Enevoldsen (1907–1980), Danish chess master
Thomas Enevoldsen (born 1987), Danish footballer